Pompholyx may refer to:
 Pompholyx, certain eczema, see dyshidrosis
 Pompholyx (rotifer), a genus of rotifers in the family Testudinellidae
 Pompholyx, a genus of insects in the family Pneumoridae, synonym of Prostalia
 Pompholyx, a genus of fungi in the family Sclerodermataceae, synonym of Scleroderma